Bissam Cuttack is a Vidhan Sabha constituency of Rayagada district, Odisha.

This constituency includes Bissam Cuttack block, Kalyansinghpur block, Kolnara block and Muniguda block.

Elected Members

Fifteen elections were held between 1951 and 2014.
Elected members from the Bissam Cuttack constituency are: 
2019: (139):Jagannath Saraka (BJD)
2014: (139):Jagannath Saraka (BJD)
2009: (139): Damburudhara Ulaka (Congress)
2004: (81): Damburudhara Ulaka (Congress)
2000: (81): Sarangdhar Kadraka (BJD)
1995: (81): Damburudhara Ulaka (Congress)
1990: (81): Sarangdhar Kadraka (Janata Dal)
1985: (81): Ulaka Rama Chandra (Congress)
1980: (81): Ulaka Rama Chandra (Congress-I)
1977: (81): Damburudhara Ulaka (Congress)
1974: (81): Damburudhara Ulaka (Congress)
1971: (77): Sripati Praska (Swatantra Party)
1967: (77): Bishwanath Choudhary (Swatantra Party)
1961: (12): Bishwanath Choudhary (Ganatantra Parishad)
1951: (8): Shyamaghana Ulaka (Ganatantra Parishad)

2019 Election Result

2014 Election Result
In 2014 election, Biju Janata Dal candidate Jagannath Saraka defeated Indian National Congress candidate Dambarudhar Ulaka by a margin of 29,186 votes.

2009 Election Result
In 2009 election, Indian National Congress candidate Dambarudhar Ulaka defeated Biju Janata Dal candidate Jagannath Saraka by a margin of 349 votes.

Notes

References

Assembly constituencies of Odisha
Rayagada district